Pe with middle hook (Ҧ ҧ; italics: Ҧ ҧ) is a letter of the Cyrillic script. Its form is derived from the Cyrillic letter Pe (П п) by the addition of a hook to the middle of the right leg.

Computing codes

See also
Cyrillic characters in Unicode

References
Unicode.org Notes on Abkhaz

Cyrillic letters with diacritics
Letters with hook